Pittsburgh Allegheny was the name of the first professional baseball club to represent Pittsburgh, Pennsylvania. The team was an unrelated forerunner to the American Association's Pittsburgh Alleghenies that were established in 1882, which continue today as the Pittsburgh Pirates.

History

Founding

Following the American Civil War, the leading baseball clubs in Pittsburgh were the "Enterprise", "Olympic", and "Xantha" teams. They played at Union Park, was located in the city of Allegheny, before it became annexed into Pittsburgh in 1907. On February 2, 1876, Pittsburgh lost its bid for a franchise in the newly established National League. Twenty days later, several local organizers formed the Allegheny Base Ball Club. Allegheny played their first game, defeating the Xanthas 7-3 at Union Park on April 15, 1876.

On February 20, 1877 the International Association was founded in Pittsburgh, and consisted of seven teams that played within Canada and the United States. It is probably the first minor league in baseball history. On February 22, 1877, after a year of playing as an independent club, Allegheny officially joined the new league. The club paid a $25 ($ in  dollars) entry fee and joined the new league.

1877 season
The Allegheny would finish the season with a 13-6 record, the second best winning percentage in the league. The club consisted of 12 players in 1877, all of which later  made it the majors. No other team in the league used so few players or had a total progression rate to the majors. The manager of the team was Denny McKnight, a lifelong Pittsburgh native who later went on to manage the major league Alleghenies 1884 season for 110 games. McKnight also served as the International Association's president after Candy Cummings resigned.

Allegheny did make two historic firsts in their brief history. On June 2, 1877 Allegheny played in the first professional game to be decided in 19-innings. That day the club was defeated by a club representing Memphis, Tennessee in the League Alliance. Later that month on June 20, 1877 Allegheny tied a club representing Indianapolis and the League Alliance, 2-2, in the first game to be decided in 17-innings.

1878 season
The league existed for the 1878 season and while none of the players returned to the team, the roster did include future Pittsburgh Alleghenys players; Chappy Lane and George Strief, who would later hit the very first home run in the history of the Pirates franchise. Jack Glasscock, who played shortstop for the 1893-94 Pirates received his start with International Association's Allegheny club as did an 18-year-old pitcher, Mickey Welch. He would go on to win 307 major league games and gain induction into the Baseball Hall of Fame.

Demise
Despite gaining membership to the International League the following season, the club folded in 1878, unable to compete with the strong, local independent squads like the East Liberty Stars or the Olympics, which were better-rooted in the Pittsburgh neighborhoods and workplaces. Despite a rule prohibiting "a person leaving one club and joining another without proper release" Allegheny was hit hard with player defections and formally folded on June 8, 1878, posting a dismal 3-23 record.

Team name
Having no official nickname, the Allegheny team was commonly referred to by its pluralized city name, i.e., the Alleghenys or Alleghenies.

Rosters

(from Baseball Reference Bullpen)

(from Baseball Reference Bullpen)

References

Baseball teams established in 1876
Sports clubs disestablished in 1878
Defunct baseball teams in Pennsylvania
Defunct minor league baseball teams
Baseball teams in Pittsburgh
Pittsburgh Pirates
1876 establishments in Pennsylvania
Baseball teams disestablished in 1878